Women were initially granted the right to serve in the Philippine military only in the reserve ranks and the technical services as part of the Women's Auxiliary Corps established in 1963. In 1993, women were granted the rights to become trained combat soldiers in the Philippine military when Republic Act No. 7192 was passed, which granted women in the Philippines to become cadets in the Philippine Military Academy in April that year.

Background 
Since the beginning of the creation of the Philippine military approximately on October 25, 1899, the Armed Forces of the Philippines never had female soldiers.

Notable Filipino women soldiers
The first batch of female cadets to graduate as soldiers in the Philippines was in 1997. Among the notable female cadets was Arlene A. Dela Cruz from the batch of graduates of 1999, who received awards such as the Presidential Saber, the Philippine Navy Award, the Navy Courses Plaque, the Social Sciences Plaque, and the Humanities Plaque. Dela Cruz died in a car crash in 2008.  

In 2011, Brigadier General Ramona Go, from San Dionisio, Iloilo, became the first female general in the Philippine Army after being a regular officer. There had been other female generals in the Philippine military, but unlike Go, those female generals were "technical service" crew, serving in the military as nurses. 

In peacekeeping in October 2013, Philippine Navy Captain Luzviminda Camacho became the first female officer from the Philippines to lead "the Philippine contingent to a peacekeeping mission of the United Nations. Camacho became the "commander of the 17th Philippine Contingent to Haiti". In addition, Camacho also became the first female "commanding officer of a Navy ship".

See also
Women in the Philippines
Women in the military
Women in the Philippine National Police
Lina Sarmiento
Lason Batch

References

External links

Philippine Military Academy alumni
Military history of the Philippines
Filipino female military personnel